Eudoxus of Cnidus (Eúdoxos ho Knídios) was an ancient Greek astronomer, mathematician, scholar, and student of Archytas and Plato. All of his original works are lost, though some fragments are preserved in Hipparchus' commentary on Aratus's poem on astronomy. Sphaerics by Theodosius of Bithynia may be based on a work by Eudoxus.

Life

Eudoxus was born and died in Cnidus (also spelled Knidos), which was a city on the southwest coast of Asia Minor.
His name Eudoxus means "honored" or "of good repute" (from eu "good" and doxa "opinion, belief, fame"). It is analogous to the Latin name Benedictus.

Eudoxus's father, Aeschines of Cnidus, loved to watch stars at night. Eudoxus first traveled to Tarentum to study with Archytas, from whom he learned mathematics. While in Italy, Eudoxus visited Sicily, where he studied medicine with Philiston.

At the age of 23, he traveled with the physician Theomedon—who (according to Diogenes Laërtius) some believed was his lover—to Athens to study with the followers of Socrates. He eventually attended lectures of Plato and other philosophers for several months, but due to a disagreement they had a falling-out. Eudoxus was quite poor and could only afford an apartment at Piraeus. Due to his poverty, his friends raised funds sufficient to send him to Heliopolis, Egypt, to pursue his study of astronomy and mathematics. He lived there for 16 months. From Egypt, he then traveled north to Cyzicus, located on the south shore of the Sea of Marmara, the Propontis. He traveled south to the court of Mausolus. During his travels he gathered many students of his own.

Around 368 BC, Eudoxus returned to Athens with his students. According to some sources, around 367 he assumed headship (scholarch) of the Academy during Plato's period in Syracuse, and taught Aristotle. He eventually returned to his native Cnidus, where he served in the city assembly. While in Cnidus, he built an observatory and continued writing and lecturing on theology, astronomy, and meteorology. He had one son, Aristagoras, and three daughters, Actis, Philtis, and Delphis.

In mathematical astronomy, his fame is due to the introduction of the concentric spheres, and his early contributions to understanding the movement of the planets.

His work on proportions shows insight into real numbers; it allows rigorous treatment of continuous quantities and not just whole numbers or even rational numbers. When it was revived by Tartaglia and others in the 16th century, it became the basis for quantitative work in science, and inspired the work of Richard Dedekind.

Craters on Mars and the Moon are named in his honor. An algebraic curve (the Kampyle of Eudoxus) is also named after him.

Mathematics
Eudoxus is considered by some to be the greatest of classical Greek mathematicians, and in all Antiquity second only to Archimedes.  Eudoxus was probably the source for most of book V of Euclid's .  He rigorously developed Antiphon's method of exhaustion,  a precursor to the integral calculus which was also used in a masterly way by Archimedes in the following century.  In applying the method, Eudoxus proved such mathematical statements as: areas of circles are to one another as the squares of their radii, volumes of spheres are to one another as the cubes of their radii, the volume of a pyramid is one-third the volume of a prism with the same base and altitude, and the volume of a cone is one-third that of the corresponding cylinder.  

Eudoxus introduced the idea of non-quantified mathematical magnitude to describe and work with continuous geometrical entities such as lines, angles, areas and volumes, thereby avoiding the use of irrational numbers. In doing so, he reversed a Pythagorean emphasis on number and arithmetic, focusing instead on geometrical concepts as the basis of rigorous mathematics. Some Pythagoreans, such as Eudoxus's teacher Archytas, had believed that only arithmetic could provide a basis for proofs. Induced by the need to understand and operate with incommensurable quantities, Eudoxus established what may have been the first deductive organization of mathematics on the basis of explicit axioms. The change in focus by Eudoxus stimulated a divide in mathematics which lasted two thousand years. In combination with a Greek intellectual attitude unconcerned with practical problems, there followed a significant retreat from the development of techniques in arithmetic and algebra.

The Pythagoreans had discovered that the diagonal of a square does not have a common unit of measurement with the sides of the square; this is the famous discovery that the square root of 2 cannot be expressed as the ratio of two integers. This discovery had heralded the existence of incommensurable quantities beyond the integers and rational fractions, but at the same time it threw into question the idea of measurement and calculations in geometry as a whole. For example, Euclid provides an elaborate proof of the Pythagorean theorem (Elements I.47), by using addition of areas and only much later (Elements VI.31) a simpler proof from similar triangles, which relies on ratios of line segments.

Ancient Greek mathematicians calculated not with quantities and equations as we do today, but instead they used proportionalities to express the relationship between quantities. Thus the ratio of two similar quantities was not just a numerical value, as we think of it today; the ratio of two similar quantities was a primitive relationship between them.

Eudoxus was able to restore confidence in the use of proportionalities by providing an astounding definition for the meaning of the equality between two ratios. This definition of proportion forms the subject of Euclid's Book V.

In Definition 5 of Euclid's Book V we read:

By using modern-day notation, this is clarified as follows. If we take four quantities: a, b, c, and d, then the first and second have a ratio ; similarly the third and fourth have a ratio .

Now to say that  we do the following:
For any two arbitrary integers, m and n, form the equimultiples
m·a and m·c of the first and third; likewise form the equimultiples n·b and n·d of the second and fourth.

If it happens that m·a > n·b, then we must also have m·c > n·d.
If it happens that m·a = n·b, then we must also have m·c = n·d. Finally, if it happens that m·a < n·b, then we must also have m·c < n·d.

Notice that the definition depends on comparing the similar quantities m·a and n·b, and the similar quantities m·c and n·d, and does not depend on the existence of a common unit of measuring these quantities.

The complexity of the definition reflects the deep conceptual and methodological innovation involved. It brings to mind the famous fifth postulate of Euclid concerning parallels, which is more extensive and complicated in its wording than the other postulates.

The Eudoxian definition of proportionality uses the quantifier, "for every ..." to harness the infinite and the infinitesimal, just as do the modern epsilon-delta definitions of limit and continuity.

Additionally, the Archimedean property stated as definition 4 of Euclid's book V is originally due not to Archimedes but to Eudoxus.

Astronomy

In ancient Greece, astronomy was a branch of mathematics; astronomers sought to create geometrical models that could imitate the appearances of celestial motions. Identifying the astronomical work of Eudoxus as a separate category is therefore a modern convenience. Some of Eudoxus's astronomical texts whose names have survived include:

 Disappearances of the Sun, possibly on eclipses
 Oktaeteris (Ὀκταετηρίς), on an eight-year lunisolar-Venus cycle of the calendar
 Phaenomena (Φαινόμενα) and Enoptron (Ἔνοπτρον), on spherical astronomy, probably based on observations made by Eudoxus in Egypt and Cnidus
 On Speeds, on planetary motions

We are fairly well informed about the contents of Phaenomena, for Eudoxus's prose text was the basis for a poem of the same name by Aratus. Hipparchus quoted from the text of Eudoxus in his commentary on Aratus.

Eudoxan planetary models

A general idea of the content of On Speeds can be gleaned from Aristotle's Metaphysics XII, 8, and a commentary by Simplicius of Cilicia (6th century AD) on De caelo, another work by Aristotle. According to a story reported by Simplicius, Plato posed a question for Greek astronomers: "By the assumption of what uniform and orderly motions can the apparent motions of the planets be accounted for?" Plato proposed that the seemingly chaotic wandering motions of the planets could be explained by combinations of uniform circular motions centered on a spherical Earth, apparently a novel idea in the 4th century BC.

In most modern reconstructions of the Eudoxan model, the Moon is assigned three spheres:

 The outermost rotates westward once in 24 hours, explaining rising and setting.
 The second rotates eastward once in a month, explaining the monthly motion of the Moon through the zodiac.
 The third also completes its revolution in a month, but its axis is tilted at a slightly different angle, explaining motion in latitude (deviation from the ecliptic), and the motion of the lunar nodes.

The Sun is also assigned three spheres. The second completes its motion in a year instead of a month. The inclusion of a third sphere implies that Eudoxus mistakenly believed that the Sun had motion in latitude.

The five visible planets (Mercury, Venus, Mars, Jupiter, and Saturn) are assigned four spheres each:

 The outermost explains the daily motion.
 The second explains the planet's motion through the zodiac.
 The third and fourth together explain retrogradation, when a planet appears to slow down, then briefly reverse its motion through the zodiac. By inclining the axes of the two spheres with respect to each other, and rotating them in opposite directions but with equal periods, Eudoxus could make a point on the inner sphere trace out a figure-eight shape, or hippopede.

Importance of Eudoxan system
Callippus, a Greek astronomer of the 4th century, added seven spheres to Eudoxus's original 27 (in addition to the planetary spheres, Eudoxus included a sphere for the fixed stars). Aristotle described both systems, but insisted on adding "unrolling" spheres between each set of spheres to cancel the motions of the outer set. Aristotle was concerned about the physical nature of the system; without unrollers, the outer motions would be transferred to the inner planets.

A major flaw in the Eudoxian system is its inability to explain changes in the brightness of planets as seen from Earth. Because the spheres are concentric, planets will always remain at the same distance from Earth. This problem was pointed out in Antiquity by Autolycus of Pitane. Astronomers responded by introducing the deferent and epicycle, which caused a planet to vary its distance. However, Eudoxus's importance to astronomy and in particular to Greek astronomy is considerable.

Ethics
Aristotle, in the Nicomachean Ethics, attributes to Eudoxus an argument in favor of hedonism—that is, that pleasure is the ultimate good that activity strives for.  According to Aristotle, Eudoxus put forward the following arguments for this position:
 All things, rational and irrational, aim at pleasure; things aim at what they believe to be good; a good indication of what the chief good is would be the thing that most things aim at.
 Similarly, pleasure's opposite—pain—is universally avoided, which provides additional support for the idea that pleasure is universally considered good.
 People don't seek pleasure as a means to something else, but as an end in its own right.
 Any other good that you can think of would be better if pleasure were added to it, and it is only by good that good can be increased.
 Of all of the things that are good, happiness is peculiar for not being praised, which may show that it is the crowning good.

See also 
 Euclid
 Euclid's 
 Eudoxus reals (a fairly recently discovered construction of the real numbers, named in his honor)
 Delian problem
 Incommensurable magnitudes
 Speusippus

References

Bibliography 

 
 
 

 
 
 Lasserre, François (1966) Die Fragmente des Eudoxos von Knidos (de Gruyter: Berlin)
 
 Manitius, C. (1894) Hipparchi in Arati et Eudoxi Phaenomena Commentariorum Libri Tres (Teubner)

External links 

 Working model and complete explanation of the Eudoxus's Spheres
 Eudoxus (and Plato), a documentary on Eudoxus, including a description of his planetary model
 Dennis Duke, "Statistical dating of the Phaenomena of Eudoxus", DIO, volume 15 see pages 7 to 23
 Eudoxus of Cnidus Britannica.com
 Eudoxus of Cnidus Donald Allen, Professor, Texas A&M University
 Eudoxos of Knidos (Eudoxus of Cnidus): astronomy and homocentric spheres Henry Mendell, Cal State U, LA
 Herodotus Project: Extensive B+W photo essay of Cnidus
 Models of Planetary Motion—Eudoxus, Craig McConnell, Ph.D., Cal State, Fullerton
 
 The Universe According to Eudoxus (Java applet)

5th-century BC births
4th-century BC deaths
4th-century BC Greek physicians
4th-century BC philosophers
Academic philosophers
Ancient Greek astronomers
Ancient Greek mathematicians
Ancient Greek ethicists
Ancient Cnidians
Students of Plato
4th-century BC mathematicians
People from Muğla Province